Campylopus is a genus of 180 species of haplolepideous mosses (Dicranidae) in the family Leucobryaceae. The name comes from the Greek campylos, meaning curved, and pous, meaning foot, referring to the setae which curve downwards.

Distribution 
The genus is represented worldwide, with species found in North America, Mexico, West Indies, Central America, South America, Europe, Asia, Africa, Atlantic Islands, Pacific Islands, and Australia. Campylopus bicolor is an example found in Australia.

The North American list of species from the genus was revised by Jan-Peter Frahm in 1980. This was based on his own study of over 1,000 herbarium specimens. The most recent checklist of the mosses of North America lists 18 species as being present in North American flora. However, due to a misidentification, there are only 17 accepted species in the region.

Species 
Species adapted from The Plant List;

Campylopus abbreviatus 
Campylopus acicularis 
Campylopus acuminatus 
Campylopus acuminatus var. kirkii 
Campylopus aemulans 
Campylopus alatus 
Campylopus albidovirens 
Campylopus alpigena 
Campylopus ambiguus 
Campylopus amboroensis 
Campylopus anderssonii 
Campylopus andreanus 
Campylopus angustiretis 
Campylopus arbogastii 
Campylopus arboricola 
Campylopus archboldii 
Campylopus arctocarpus 
Campylopus arctocarpus subsp. caldensis 
Campylopus arctocarpus subsp. madecassus 
Campylopus arcuatus 
Campylopus areodictyon 
Campylopus argyrocaulon 
Campylopus asperifolius 
Campylopus asperulus 
Campylopus atlanticus 
Campylopus atroluteus 
Campylopus atrovirens 
Campylopus aureonitens 
Campylopus australis 
Campylopus austro-alpinus 
Campylopus austrostramineus 
Campylopus austrosubulatus 
Campylopus bartramiaceus 
Campylopus basalticola 
Campylopus beauverdianus 
Campylopus belangeri 
Campylopus benedictii 
Campylopus bicolor 
Campylopus bicolor subsp. atroluteus 
Campylopus bolivianus 
Campylopus brevipilus 
Campylopus brevipilus var. elatus  
Campylopus brunneus 
Campylopus bryotropii 
Campylopus caespitosus 
Campylopus caldensis 
Campylopus cambouei 
Campylopus capillaceus 
Campylopus capitulatus 
Campylopus carolinae 
Campylopus catarractilis 
Campylopus caudatus 
Campylopus cavifolius 
Campylopus chevalieri 
Campylopus chilensis 
Campylopus chionophilus 
Campylopus chrismarii 
Campylopus chrysodictyon 
Campylopus circinatus 
Campylopus cirrhatus 
Campylopus clavatus 
Campylopus cleefii 
Campylopus clemensiae 
Campylopus cockaynii 
Campylopus comatus 
Campylopus comosus 
Campylopus concolor 
Campylopus contortus 
Campylopus coreensis 
Campylopus crassissimus 
Campylopus crateris 
Campylopus cribrosus 
Campylopus crispatulus 
Campylopus cruegeri 
Campylopus cryptopodioides 
Campylopus cubensis 
Campylopus cucullatifolius 
Campylopus cuspidatus 
Campylopus cygneus 
Campylopus decaryi 
Campylopus densicoma 
Campylopus denudatus 
Campylopus denudatus var. uncinatus 
Campylopus dichrostris 
Campylopus dicnemoides 
Campylopus dicranoides 
Campylopus didictyon 
Campylopus didymodon 
Campylopus dietrichiae 
Campylopus durelii 
Campylopus edithae 
Campylopus ellipticus 
Campylopus ericeticola 
Campylopus ericoides 
Campylopus euphorocladus 
Campylopus exaltatus 
Campylopus exasperatus 
Campylopus exasperatus var. lorentzii 
Campylopus exfimbriatus 
Campylopus extinctus 
Campylopus ferromecoae 
Campylopus filicuspis 
Campylopus filifolius 
Campylopus filiformis 
Campylopus flaccidus 
Campylopus flagellaceus 
Campylopus flagellifer 
Campylopus flavonigritus 
Campylopus flexuosus 
Campylopus flexuosus var. incacorralis 
Campylopus flexuosus var. paradoxus 
Campylopus flindersii 
Campylopus fragiliformis 
Campylopus fragilis 
Campylopus fragilis 
Campylopus fragilis subsp. fragiliformis 
Campylopus fragilis subsp. goughii 
Campylopus fragilis 
Campylopus fragilis var. pyriformis 
Campylopus fragilis subsp. zollingerianus 
Campylopus fulvus 
Campylopus funalis 
Campylopus fuscocroceus 
Campylopus fuscolutescens 
Campylopus galapagensis 
Campylopus gardneri 
Campylopus gastro-alaris 
Campylopus gemmatus 
Campylopus gemmiparus 
Campylopus geraensis 
Campylopus gibboso-alaris 
Campylopus gracilentus 
Campylopus gracilis 
Campylopus grimmioides 
Campylopus griseus 
Campylopus guaitecae 
Campylopus handelii 
Campylopus harpophyllus 
Campylopus hawaiicus 
Campylopus hawaiicus var. densifolius 
Campylopus hawaiicus var. hawaiicoflexuosus 
Campylopus hensii 
Campylopus heterostachys 
Campylopus hildebrandtii 
Campylopus hoffmannii 
Campylopus homalobolax 
Campylopus huallagensis 
Campylopus humoricola 
Campylopus incacorralis 
Campylopus incertus 
Campylopus incrassatus 
Campylopus incurvatus 
Campylopus ingeniensis 
Campylopus introflexus 
Campylopus introflexus var. altecristatus 
Campylopus introflexus var. tullgrenii 
Campylopus irrigatus 
Campylopus itacolumitis 
Campylopus jamesonii 
Campylopus johannis-meyeri 
Campylopus joshii 
Campylopus jugorum 
Campylopus julaceus 
Campylopus julaceus subsp. arbogastii 
Campylopus julicaulis 
Campylopus kaalaasii 
Campylopus kirkii 
Campylopus kivuensis 
Campylopus laevis 
Campylopus lamellinervis 
Campylopus lamprodictyon 
Campylopus laniger 
Campylopus laxitextus 
Campylopus laxoventralis 
Campylopus leptotrichaceus 
Campylopus leucochlorus 
Campylopus liebmannii 
Campylopus liliputanus 
Campylopus longescens 
Campylopus longicellularis 
Campylopus lorentzii 
Campylopus luteus 
Campylopus macgregorii 
Campylopus macrogaster 
Campylopus madecassus 
Campylopus magniretis 
Campylopus marginatulus 
Campylopus megalotus 
Campylopus milleri 
Campylopus modestus 
Campylopus nanophyllus 
Campylopus nepalensis 
Campylopus nivalis 
Campylopus nivalis var. multicapsularis 
Campylopus oblongus 
Campylopus obrutus 
Campylopus occultus 
Campylopus oerstedianus 
Campylopus orthocomus 
Campylopus orthopelma 
Campylopus orthopodius 
Campylopus ovalis 
Campylopus pachyneuros 
Campylopus pascuanus 
Campylopus patens 
Campylopus pauper 
Campylopus pauper var. lamprodictyon 
Campylopus pauper var. minor 
Campylopus pelidnus 
Campylopus percurvatus 
Campylopus perexilis 
Campylopus perichaetialis 
Campylopus perpusillus 
Campylopus perrottetii 
Campylopus peruvianus 
Campylopus pilifer 
Campylopus pilifer var. lamellatus 
Campylopus pilifer subsp. vaporarius 
Campylopus pittieri 
Campylopus pittieri var. congestus 
Campylopus pleurocarpus 
Campylopus praemorsus 
Campylopus praetermissus 
Campylopus pseudobicolor 
Campylopus pseudomuelleri 
Campylopus pseudonanus 
Campylopus pterotoneuron 
Campylopus ptychotheca 
Campylopus pulvinatus 
Campylopus purpureocaulis 
Campylopus pyriformis 
Campylopus rauei 
Campylopus reconditus 
Campylopus recurvifolius 
Campylopus recurvus 
Campylopus reflexisetus 
Campylopus refractus 
Campylopus revolvens 
Campylopus richardii 
Campylopus robillardei 
Campylopus robillardei var. perauriculatus 
Campylopus rosulatus 
Campylopus savannarum 
Campylopus saxicola 
Campylopus schimperi 
Campylopus schmidii 
Campylopus schmidii subsp. hemitrichius 
Campylopus scoposum 
Campylopus scottianus 
Campylopus searellii 
Campylopus sehnemii 
Campylopus sellowii 
Campylopus sericeoides 
Campylopus serratus 
Campylopus serrifolius 
Campylopus setifolius 
Campylopus sharpii 
Campylopus shawii 
Campylopus sinensis 
Campylopus smaragdinus 
Campylopus sordidus 
Campylopus spiralis 
Campylopus standleyi 
Campylopus subchlorophyllosus 
Campylopus subcomosus 
Campylopus subconcolor 
Campylopus subcuspidatus 
Campylopus subcuspidatus var. damazii 
Campylopus subfalcatus 
Campylopus subfragilis 
Campylopus subjugorum 
Campylopus subluteus 
Campylopus subnanus 
Campylopus subnitens 
Campylopus subporodictyon 
Campylopus subtrachyblepharus 
Campylopus subulatus 
Campylopus subulatus var. elongatus 
Campylopus subulatus f. expallidus 
Campylopus surinamensis 
Campylopus taiwanensis 
Campylopus tallulensis 
Campylopus tenax 
Campylopus tenuinervis 
Campylopus tenuissimus 
Campylopus terebrifolius 
Campylopus thwaitesii 
Campylopus torfaceus 
Campylopus torrentis 
Campylopus trachyblepharon 
Campylopus trachyblepharon subsp. comatus 
Campylopus trichophylloides 
Campylopus trivialis 
Campylopus uleanus 
Campylopus uncinatus 
Campylopus valerioi 
Campylopus validinervis 
Campylopus vesticaulis 
Campylopus walkeri 
Campylopus weberbaueri 
Campylopus weddelii 
Campylopus wheeleri 
Campylopus widgrenii 
Campylopus yungarum 
Campylopus zollingerianus 
Campylopus zygodonticarpus

References

 

Moss genera
Dicranales